Milena Bajić (born 13 November 1996) is Montenegrin college basketball player for the New Jersey Institute of Technology.

Memphis and NJIT statistics 
Source

Table Ratios and Totals

Professional career

Personal life
Milena is daughter of Darko and Gordana Bajić, business finance major.

References

External links
NJIT Highlanders bio
Profile at FIBA Europe
Profile at eurobasket.com

1996 births
Living people
Centers (basketball)
Memphis Tigers women's basketball players
Montenegrin expatriate basketball people in the United States
Montenegrin women's basketball players
Power forwards (basketball)
Sportspeople from Podgorica